The La Honda Creek Open Space Preserve is a publicly accessible 6,142-acre open space reserve in San Mateo County, California, part of the Midpeninsula Regional Open Space District. It opened to the public in November 2017. The preserve was established in 1984. It was for years the largest of the open space preserve in the county not open to the public.

Geography
La Honda Creek has its upper watershed in the preserve.

References

External links
La Honda Creek Preserve website

Protected areas of San Mateo County, California
2017 in California
1984 establishments in California
Bay Area Ridge Trail
Protected areas established in 1984